Al-Bayt Stadium is a retractable roof football stadium in Al Khor, Qatar, which was opened in time for matches in the 2022 FIFA World Cup, which began on 20 November 2022. The stadium's construction contract was awarded to Qatari contractor Galfar Al Misnad, Webuild S.p.A. and Cimolai in 2015. In January 2020, the stadium received sustainability certificates of green design, construction management and energy efficiency. International observers have criticized the treatment of workers in the construction of the stadium.

The stadium was the furthest from Doha, it was 35 km away.

Plans 
Al Bayt Stadium hosted the opening match of the 2022 World Cup, and hosted a semi-final and a quarter-final match. The stadium hosted around 60,000 World Cup fans, including 1,000 seats for press. The architectural design takes its inspiration from the traditional tents of the nomadic peoples of Qatar and the region. It features a retractable roof, providing covered seating for all spectators. It connects to transportation systems and have onsite parking for 6,000 cars, 350 buses and the coming and going of 150 public buses/shuttles, as well as 1,000 taxis and water taxis. The stadium is certified for its sustainability credentials under the Global Sustainability Assessment System (GSAS) for a number of certifications representing sustainable design & build, construction management practices and the efficiency of its energy centre. The stadium also received a five-star GSAS rating.

The stadium also includes luxurious hotel suites and rooms with balcony views of the football field.

To mark the National Sports Day, stadium's adjacent park's official opening was announced to be held on Qatar's sports day itself, 11 February 2020.

Construction 
The Al Bayt Stadium in Qatar was one of eight stadiums used in the 2022 FIFA World Cup, the second largest after Lusail Stadium. The stadium was designed by Dar Al-Handasah. Following the World Cup, it is expected to be reconfigured into a 32,000-seat stadium. Excess seats will be removed from the upper tier and donated to other countries or placed on the infrastructure planned for the 2030 Asian Games. The vacated space will then be converted into a five-star hotel, shopping mall and another sports facilities.

The tent-like structure has four stands, each of whose exterior walls and peaked roofs are covered in polytetrafluoroethylene (PTFE) woven fibreglass membrane. The exterior part of the PTFE membrane is coloured in traditional black, white and red colours to further reference Qatar's nomadic people's tents. A retractable roof connects the four stands to enclose the stadium.

History 
The inauguration of the stadium took place on 30 November 2021, on the occasion of opening ceremony for the 2021 FIFA Arab Cup, followed by a match between the host Qatar and Bahrain, in which the reigning Asian champion Qatar survived a last-minute scare to fend off the visitor 1–0, courtesy of a header from Abdulaziz Hatem in the 69th minute.

This event was attended by the Emir (head of state) of Qatar, Sheikh Tamim bin Hamad Al Thani. FIFA President Gianni Infantino,  several Heads of State and authorities and Presidents from member associations to enjoy the inauguration ceremony of Al Bayt Stadium and to mark the official opening of the 2021 FIFA Arab Cup. The newly built stadium hosted five matches during FIFA Arab Cup 2021, including the final of the tournament on 18 December 2021.

On 20 November 2022, the stadium hosted the opening game of the FIFA World Cup between Qatar and Ecuador; 67,372 were reported to be in attendance at kick-off, despite the capacity of the stadium being 60,000.

Recent tournament results

2021 FIFA Arab Cup

Al Bayt Stadium hosted five matches during the 2021 FIFA Arab Cup, including the final.

2022 FIFA World Cup 

Al Bayt Stadium hosted nine matches during the 2022 FIFA World Cup.

See also
 List of association football stadiums by capacity

References

External links

Al-Bayt Stadium Project

Al Bayt Stadium
Al Bayt Stadium
Venues of the 2030 Asian Games
Asian Games football venues
Retractable-roof stadiums
2021 establishments in Qatar
Sports venues completed in 2021